FHK may refer to:

 Feeding Hong Kong, food bank in Hong Kong
 Fredericia HK, Danish handball club
 "Free Hong Kong", slogan for Hong Kong democracy movement
 Kempten University of Applied Sciences (formerly Fachhochschule Kempten)
 Technical University of Cologne (formerly Fachhochschule Köln)